Leufroyia is a genus of sea snails, marine gastropod mollusks in the family Raphitomidae.

Description
(Original description) This is a distinct group with swollen whorls. The axial ribs and the spirally striate riblets form a reticulate structure. The shell is internally smoothed. The aperture is smooth, without denticles or grooves.

Species
Species within the genus Leufroyia include:
 † Leufroyia aldrovandi (Millet, 1865) 
 † Leufroyia alternata (Millet, 1865) 
 † Leufroyia annegienae Landau, Van Dingenen & Ceulemans, 2020 
 Leufroyia concinna (Scacchi, 1836)
 Leufroyia erronea Monterosato, 1884
 † Leufroyia ferrierii Brunetti & Della Bella, 2006 
 † Leufroyia hesseli Landau, Van Dingenen & Ceulemans, 2020 
 † Leufroyia landreauensis (Ceulemans, Van Dingenen & Landau, 2018) 
 Leufroyia leufroyi (Michaud, 1828)
 † Leufroyia ligeriana Landau, Van Dingenen & Ceulemans, 2020 †
 † Leufroyia renauleauensis Landau, Van Dingenen & Ceulemans, 2020 †
 † Leufroyia riccardoi Landau, Van Dingenen & Ceulemans, 2020 †
 † Leufroyia seani Landau, Van Dingenen & Ceulemans, 2020 †
 † Leufroyia turtaudierei (Ceulemans, Van Dingenen & Landau, 2018) 
 Leufroyia villaria (Pusateri & Giannuzzi-Savelli, 2008)

References

External links
 
 Worldwide Mollusc Species Data Base: Raphitomidae
 Fassio, G.; Russini, V.; Pusateri, F.; Giannuzzi-Savelli, R.; Høisæter, T.; Puillandre, N.; Modica, M. V.; Oliverio, M. (2019). An assessment of Raphitoma and allied genera (Neogastropoda: Raphitomidae). Journal of Molluscan Studie
 Crosse H. (1885). Nomenclatura generica e specifica di alcune conchiglie mediterranee, pel Marchese di Monterosato [book review]. Journal de Conchyliologie 33: 139-142

 
Gastropod genera